The Argentine Handball Confederation (CAH) is the governing body of handball and beach handball in the Argentine Republic. Founded on 15 October 1921, CAH is affiliated to the International Handball Federation and the South and Central America Handball Confederation. CAH is also affiliated to the Argentine Olympic Committee. It is based in Buenos Aires.

National Tournament

References

External links
 Official Website (in Spanish only)
 Argentina at the IHF website.

Handball in Argentina
Pan-American Team Handball Federation
Sports organizations established in 1921
Handball
1921 establishments in Argentina